Joshua Zapata González (born 28 January 1989), known simply as Joshua, is a Spanish professional footballer who plays for Fútbol Alcobendas Sport as a midfielder.

Club career
Born in Madrid, Joshua played his youth football with local Atlético Madrid. He spent the vast majority of his senior spell with the club, however, registered with the reserves in Segunda División B.

Joshua made his La Liga debut for the first team on 18 May 2008, playing 15 minutes in a 1–3 away loss to Valencia CF for the season's last round. In summer 2010 he left and signed with neighbouring CF Rayo Majadahonda from Tercera División, where he notably scored a goal against his former employer's C-side on 19 December.

References

External links

1989 births
Living people
Footballers from Madrid
Spanish footballers
Association football midfielders
La Liga players
Segunda División B players
Tercera División players
Atlético Madrid B players
Atlético Madrid footballers
CF Rayo Majadahonda players
Real Zaragoza B players
CD Guadalajara (Spain) footballers
RSD Alcalá players
CD Paracuellos Antamira players
Spain youth international footballers